Guido Cantz (born August 19, 1971) is a German television presenter.

Life 
Cantz was born in Porz, Cologne. He works for German broadcasters and was the host of Deal or No Deal. Since 2010 he has been presenting the German television show Verstehen Sie Spaß?. He lives with his family in Cologne.

TV 
 2000–2011: Karnevalissimo
 2001: Unter uns (episodes 1681–1715)
 2003: Kenn ich
 2003: Die Edgar-Wallace-Show
 2004–2005: Reklame!
 2003–2009: Genial daneben (77 episodes)
 2005: Urmel aus dem Eis
 2008: Nachgetreten! (three episodes)
 2004–2008: Deal or No Deal
 2006: Tierisch Wild
 2009: Die Dreisten Drei (episode 7x02)
 2010-2021: Verstehen Sie Spaß?
 2011: Schlag den Star
 2012: Einfach die Besten
 since April 2012: Meister des Alltags
 2013-2017: Verstehen Sie was?
 2014: Pastewka: Der Bescheid

Soloprogramm:
 2006: Cantz schön frech
 2008: Ich will ein Kind von Dir
 2012: Cantz schön clever

CDs:
 2006: Cantz schön frech
 2009: Ich will ein Kind von dir!
 2012: Cantz schön clever

Bücher:
 
 2012: Cantz schön clever

References

External links 

  
 Zum Glauben gehört Humor interview, Pro Medienmagazin 6/2013 (December 2, 2013), p. 32ff

German game show hosts
1971 births
Television people from Cologne
Living people
ARD (broadcaster) people
ZDF people
RTL Group people